Pancha Ratha may refer to:

 Pancharatha, a type of Hindu temple 
 Pancha Rathas, a rock-cut site located at Mahabalipuram, India

See also
 Pancharatna (architecture),